Nuvsfjorden is a fjord in the municipality of Loppa in Troms og Finnmark, Norway. The fjord has a length of about eight kilometers.

The village of Nuvsvåg is located along the fjord. To the south is the glacier of Øksfjordjøkelen.

Name 
The name is from the Norwegian word nuv, meaning rounded hump or mountain, which is also the name of the rounded mountain Nuven at the mouth of the fjord. The Old Norse name Hnúfafjǫrðr comes from the word hnúfa, which either means hump, but it's also a byname alternately meaning "snub" or snub-nosed. The word "'hnufa' also refers to a bondmaid whose nose has been cut off for theft thrice repeated.

References

Fjords of Troms og Finnmark
Loppa